The Kingdom of Isma was a petty kingdom in the confederation of 24 states known as Chaubisi Rajya. It was situated at the top of a big hill and there were about 250 houses.

References 

Chaubisi Rajya
Isma
Isma
History of Nepal
Isma